Hader (also spelt Hadar) is a village in southern Syria, administratively part of the Khan Arnabah Subdistrict of the Quneitra Governorate. It is in the portion of the governorate that is still under Syrian, rather than Israeli, control. The town is located just outside the United Nations Disengagement Observer Force Zone. Nearby localities include Beit Jinn to the northeast, Harfa to the east, Jubata al-Khashab to the south, Majdal Shams in the Israeli−occupied Golan Heights to the west and Shebaa in Lebanon to the northwest.

Population
According to the Syria Central Bureau of Statistics, Hader had a population of 4,819 in the 2004 census. Its inhabitants are predominantly from the Druze community.

History
In the 1895–1896 conflict between the Druze of Hauran and the Ottoman government and their local allies, Hader and nearby Hina were assaulted by Circassians and Bedouin fighters from the Golan allied with the Ottomans. This followed a Druze attack which devastated 12 villages in the Hauran plain near al-Shaykh Maskin. Following the attack on Hader, Druze fighters from Majdal Shams retaliated by attacking the Circassian-inhabited village of Mansura, which in turn led to Ottoman and Circassian raids against the Druze villages in the Golan.

In mid-June 2015, during the Quneitra offensive of the Syrian Civil War, rebel forces reportedly surrounded the village, which is pro-Assad. However, their motives are disputed.

Even though the surrounding localities are under rebel control, the town had remained under government control for the entire duration of the civil war.

On 13 March 2019, Israel accused senior Lebanese Hezbollah operative Ali Musa Daqduq of having been sent to Syria and founding a network of "a few" Syrian operatives manning outposts in Hader and collecting intelligence against Israeli targets. The accusation included video footage of men walking to and from the outposts.

References

Bibliography

Druze communities in Syria
Towns in Quneitra Governorate